The 2016 Surrey Storm season saw them retain the Netball Superleague title after defeating Manchester Thunder in the grand final. During the regular season they finish second behind Thunder.

Squad

Pre-season
Team Bath's Tri-Tournament
In November 2015 Surrey Storm competed in Team Bath's Pre-season Tri-Tournament, winning against Hertfordshire Mavericks before losing to the hosts. Storm finished second in the tournament.

Friendlies

Regular season

Results
Round 1

Round 2

Round 3

Round 4

Round 5

Round 6

Round 7

Round 8

Round 9

Round 10

Round 11

Round 12

Round 13

Round 14

Final table

Play-offs

Semi-finals

Grand Final

See also
 2016 Team Bath netball season
 2015 Surrey Storm season

References

Surrey
Surrey Storm seasons